Dominick is a stop on the Luas light-rail tram system in Dublin, Ireland.  It opened in 2017 as a stop on Luas Cross City, an extension of the Green Line through the city centre from St. Stephen's Green to Broombridge.  It is located on Dominick Street Lower and provides access to Rotunda Hospital, 14 Henrietta Street, and the Dublin Institute of Technology Bolton Street Campus.  It is one of only three Luas stops with an island platform.  To the south of the stop, trams turn left onto Parnell street on their way into the city centre.  To the north, they continue along Dominick street towards Broadstone, on their way to Broombridge.

References

Luas Green Line stops in Dublin (city)
Railway stations opened in 2017
2017 establishments in Ireland
Railway stations in the Republic of Ireland opened in the 21st century